3T is an American band.

3T may also refer to:
 3T Cycling, an Italian cycle sport company
 3T,  a 2018 rap album by South African YoungstaCPT
 OnePlus 3T, a 2016 Chinese smartphone model
 Turan Air, a defunct Azerbaijani airline (IATA code: 3T)
 Taiwan, Tiananmen, Tibet, banned terms online in China

See also
T3 (disambiguation)
TTT (disambiguation)